Rareş-Iulian Manea (born July 20, 1986) is a Romanian endurance sports athlete.

Manea was born in Zărneşti, and is member of BIKE-MANIA TEAM. He started ski mountaineering in 2003, and participated in the same year in first competition, the Piatra Craiului Trophy''. He currently studies at the Faculty of Sports and Physical Education of the Transylvania University of Brașov. He also competes in mountain biking, mountain running, duathlon and triathlon events.

Selected results

Ski mountaineering 
 2005:
 8th, European Championship relay race (together with  Ionuţ Găliţeanu, Silviu Manea and Lucian Clinciu)
 2007:
 9th, European Championship relay race (together with Dimitru Frâncu, Silviu Manea and Ionuţ Găliţeanu)
 2008:
 3rd, Sinaia Winter Race 2008
 2009:
 3rd: Postavaru Night
 2010:
 2nd: Postavaru Night
 3rd, Cupa Muntele Mare
 2011:
 2nd: Postavaru Night
 2012:
 1st, Postavaru Night
 2013:
 3rd, Postavaru Night

Mountain biking 
 2009:
 1st, Geiger Mountain Bike Challenge
 3rd, Maraton Medieval Medias
 1st, Targul Secuiesc Marathon
 2010:
 1st, Iron Bike Oradea, team, together with Marius Ionaşcu
 1st, Arges Autumn Race
 1st, Geiger Mountain Bike Challenge
 5th, Surmont Marathon
 1st, On Top Of The World
 3rd, Tusnad MTB Marathon
 2nd, Alpin Sport Maraton
 2011:
 1st, Prima Evadare maraton MTB
 4th, (2nd age category) Defileul Jiului XC Maraton
 5th, (2nd age category) DHS Corvin Maraton
 3rd, Surmont Maraton  
 2nd, Geiger Mountain Bike Challenge
 3rd, Alpin Sport Maraton
 3rd, Maratonul Ţării Gugulanilor
 1st, Maros Bike Marathon
 2012:
 1st, Cyclocross National Championship Romania
 1st, Maros Bike XC (age category)
 1st, Defileul Jiului Marathon
 1st, Maratonul Medieval Medias
 1st, DHS Corvin MTB Race
 1st, My Race Iasi XCM
 2nd, Brasov XCM Marathon (semimarathon)(1st age category)
 5th, EmmedueSport Cup (1st age category) 
 2nd, Bike 3Mountains (DHSTibiscus team) 
 2013:
 1st, My Race Iasi XCM
 1st Golden Runner XCM
 2nd Brasov XCM Marathon (semimarathon)

Duathlon 
 2008:
 1st, Cetatea Brasovului duathlon
 2010:
 5th, Cetatea Brasovului duathlon
 2011:
 3rd, Tara Barsei duathlon
 2012:
 2nd, Cetatea Brasov duathlon relay race (Honey Energy Team together with Ionuţ Găliţeanu)
 3rd, Tara Barsei duathlon relay race (Honey Energy Team)

Triathlon 
 2010:
 2nd, Fara Asfalt triathlon

External links 
 Rareş Manea, skimountaineering.org
 Rares Manea si schiul-alpinism

References 

1986 births
Living people
Romanian male ski mountaineers
Marathon mountain bikers
People from Zărnești